Eucalyptus kessellii, commonly known as Jerdacuttup mallee, is a species of mallee that is endemic to an area along the south coast of Western Australia. It has very hard, rough bark on the trunk of larger specimens, smooth greyish and brownish bark above, lance-shaped to egg-shaped adult leaves, flower buds in groups of three or seven, creamy white flowers and downturned, conical to cup-shaped fruit.

Description
It forms a lignotuber. The lower part of the trunk, sometimes the entire trunk has hard but thin, rough, dark grey bark. The bark above, sometimes the entire bark on younger plants, is smooth, greyish and brownish to pink. Flowering occurs between June and September and the flowers are creamy white.

Taxonomy and naming
Eucalyptus kessellii was first formally described in 1925 by Joseph Maiden and William Blakely from a specimen collected near Salmon Gums and the description was published in Journal and Proceedings of the Royal Society of New South Wales. The specific epithet honours Stephen Lackey Kessell.

In 1992, Ken Hill and Lawrie Johnson described two subspecies and the names have been accepted by the Australian Plant Census:

Distribution and habitat
Eucalyptus kessellii grows in mallee shrubland on calcareous loams. Subspecies eugnosta occurs from near Ravensthorpe to near Condingup and as far north as Scaddan and Gibson. Subspecies kessellii grows from north-east of Salmon Gums to near Mount Ney and Mount Ridley.

Conservation status
Both subspecies of E. kessellii are classified as "not threatened" by the Western Australian Government Department of Parks and Wildlife.

See also
List of Eucalyptus species

References

Eucalypts of Western Australia
kessellii
Myrtales of Australia
Plants described in 1925
Taxa named by Joseph Maiden